Jon or Jonathan Murray may refer to:
Jon Murray (coach), American cross country coach
Jon Garth Murray, atheist activist
Jonathan Murray, television producer
Jonathan Murray House
Jon Murray, of the comedy duo Stuckey and Murray

See also
John Murray (disambiguation)